Louise Anne Bouchard, originally from Quebec, is an author, screenwriter and photographer, of Canadian and Swiss citizenship. Her first novel was Cette fois, Jeanne... (1987).

Works
 1987: Cette fois, Jeanne... VLB éditeur
 1993: La Fureur, Lausanne, L'Âge d'Homme
 1995: Pierre va se remarier avec Florence Cordobes, Lausanne, L'Âge d'Homme
 1997: Clélia fait enfin amende honorable, Lausanne, L'Âge d'Homme
 1999: Les Sans-soleil, Lausanne, L'Âge d'Homme
 2001: Vai Piano, Lausanne, L'Âge d'Homme
 2003: Montréal privé, (Private Montreal) éditions Jacques Lanctôt
 2010: Bleu Magritte, Vevey, L'Aire
 2012: Du Cœur à l'Ouvrage, edited by Louise Anne Bouchard; unpublished texts and drawings by Antonio Albanese et al., Vevey, L'Aire, 2012 
 2012: L'Effet Popescu, Lausanne, BSN Press
 2012: S'il y a un criminel à pointer du doigt, c'est le lac [short story], in Léman Noir, Marius Daniel Popesco (éd.)
 2014: Rumeurs, Lausanne, BSN Press
 2018: Nora, Genève, Slatkine
 2018: Tiercé dans l'ordre, Lausanne, BSN Press

Honors and awards
 1990 Prix de la Relève 16/26 (16mm, 26 min) for Alice in the land of merguez, directed by Bruno Carrière 
 1994 Prix Contrepoint prize for French literature (Paris) (for La Fureur)

References

External links 
 Official website
 Louise Anne Bouchard on Viceversa littérature
 [http://www.tribunes-romandes.ch/newsletter/254-entretien-avec-louise-anne-bouchard-%C3%A0-propos-de-son-roman-les-sans-soleil Entretien avec Louise Anne Bouchard à propos de son roman "Les Sans-Soleil"] on Tribunes romandes''

20th-century Canadian essayists
21st-century Canadian essayists
20th-century Canadian women writers
21st-century Canadian women writers
20th-century Swiss novelists
21st-century Swiss writers
Living people
20th-century Swiss women writers
21st-century Swiss women writers
21st-century Swiss novelists
Canadian women novelists
Swiss essayists
Swiss women novelists
Swiss women essayists
Canadian women essayists
Year of birth missing (living people)